San Pedro is a small stream in the province of Cádiz, Spain, close to Guadalete river. It runs for 25 km into the Bay of Cádiz. It flows by Bahía de Cádiz Natural Park.

See also 
 List of rivers of Spain

References

Rivers of Spain
Geography of the Province of Cádiz
Rivers of Andalusia